Robert Saleh (born January 31, 1979) is an American football coach who is the head coach for the New York Jets of the National Football League (NFL). A defensive coach for much of his 20-year coaching career, Saleh has served as an assistant coach for the Houston Texans, Seattle Seahawks, Jacksonville Jaguars, and San Francisco 49ers from 2005 to 2020, holding his first defensive coordinator position with the Niners from 2017 to 2020. Saleh has appeared in two Super Bowls, one each with the Seahawks and 49ers, winning one in 2014 with the Seahawks. Following the 2020 season, he left the 49ers to become the Jets' head coach.

Early years
Born in Dearborn, Michigan, Saleh is a 1997 graduate of Fordson High School He attended Northern Michigan University in Marquette from 1997 to 2001, where he earned a degree in finance and was a four-year starter for the Wildcats, earning all-conference honors as a tight end.

Saleh's brother David was in the South Tower during the September 11 attacks in 2001 and saw the fireball from the initial plane's impact on the North Tower from the building's 61st floor. After ignoring calls by the public intercom within Tower 2 to return to their offices, he'd made it down to the 24th floor before the second plane hit, this time around 50 floors above in his tower. He safely made it to the lobby and was able to escape to safety. Saleh credits this in providing the spark for him to pursue his dreams of coaching football. Robert Saleh is also related to Detroit Socialite Tarick Salmaci from the first season of The Contender.

Coaching career

College 
Saleh began his coaching career at the collegiate level in 2002. He spent four years working as a defensive assistant with Michigan State University (2002–03), Central Michigan University (2004) and the University of Georgia (2005).

Houston Texans 
In 2005, Saleh was hired as an intern with the Houston Texans, working with the defensive unit. In February 2006, he was retained in Gary Kubiak's staff as a defensive quality control coach under defensive coordinator Richard Smith. In January 2009, he was promoted to assistant linebackers coach.

Seattle Seahawks 
In February 2011, Saleh was hired as the defensive quality control coach for the Seattle Seahawks under Pete Carroll. He spent three seasons with the Seahawks, including their 2013 championship season when they defeated the Denver Broncos in Super Bowl XLVIII. During this span the defense was known as the Legion of Boom.

Jacksonville Jaguars 
Following the Seahawks' 2013 championship, Saleh was named linebackers coach for the Jacksonville Jaguars under head coach Gus Bradley. Saleh would not be retained under new head coach Doug Marrone.

San Francisco 49ers 
On February 13, 2017, Saleh was named defensive coordinator for the San Francisco 49ers under new head coach Kyle Shanahan. Shanahan and Saleh previously served as assistant coaches for the Houston Texans from 2006–2009.

During the 2019 season, the 49ers defense was sixth in the league in forced turnovers (27), second in total defense (281.8 yards per game), first in passing defense (169.2 yards per game), and fourth in sacks (48). This was the first time since 2003 that the 49ers finished in the top 10 in both scoring and yards per game. Saleh helped lead the team to a 13–3 record and a Super Bowl LIV berth, where they lost to the Kansas City Chiefs.

New York Jets
On January 14, 2021, Saleh signed a five-year contract to become the head coach of the New York Jets.

On September 12, 2021, Saleh lost in his head coaching debut against the Carolina Panthers by a score of 19–14. Saleh went on to win his first game as a head coach on October 3 in a 27–24 win against the Tennessee Titans in overtime. On December 22, it was reported that Saleh tested positive for COVID-19; he did not coach the Jets in their week 16 game against the Jaguars. In his first season as head coach, the Jets finished 4–13, missing the playoffs for the eleventh consecutive year.

Head coaching record

Personal life
Saleh and his wife, Sanaa, have four sons and two daughters. 

Saleh is of Lebanese descent. Upon his hiring by the Jets, he became the first Muslim head coach in NFL history.  He is also the fourth Arab-American head coach of the NFL, after Ed Khayat (Philadelphia Eagles 1971–72), Rich Kotite (Philadelphia Eagles 1991–94), and Abe Gibron (Chicago Bears 1972–1974), who are all of Lebanese descent as well. 

Saleh and his wife both speak Arabic. 

Saleh was the best man at Green Bay Packers' head coach Matt LaFleur's wedding, as the two became close while working as graduate assistants at Central Michigan in 2004 and as assistant coaches for the Houston Texans from 2008–2009.

References

External links
 New York Jets bio

1979 births
Living people
American people of Lebanese descent
American Muslims
Northern Michigan Wildcats football players
Michigan State Spartans football coaches
Central Michigan Chippewas football coaches
Georgia Bulldogs football coaches
Houston Texans coaches
Seattle Seahawks coaches
Jacksonville Jaguars coaches
San Francisco 49ers coaches
National Football League defensive coordinators
Coaches of American football from Michigan
Players of American football from Michigan
New York Jets head coaches
Sportspeople from Dearborn, Michigan
Sportspeople of Lebanese descent